Kaliningrad-Passazhirsky, also called Kaliningrad South, is the largest railway station on the Russian Kaliningrad Railway. It is located in the westernmost point of Russia — the city of Kaliningrad.

Platforms
Platform 6 of the station is a standard gauge platform, where trains arrive from Poland, Germany and other countries of Europe.

History
By the end of the 19th century Königsberg had become an important hub of the railway network, where lines in different directions — Central Germany, Poland, the Russian Empire and the Baltic countries - converged. However these different lines terminated at different stations. The idea of building a central station was proposed in 1896, and a plan was prepared in 1914. However, because of World War I, building did not begin until 1920, and the grand opening took place on 19 September 1929.

The station continued to work normally until 21 January 1945. During the battle for the city the station was significantly affected, so after the war, the station did not operate, and the role of the main passenger station served as temporary marshalling yard. The station was only reopened in 1949 by the Soviet Council of Ministers.

The first major reconstruction of the station took place in 2003 – the interiors (offices, waiting room, cafe) were refurbished. The lobby of the station was decorated with new chandeliers and a fountain, and the underground passages leading to the platforms were refurbished. Clocks were installed in the facade and lobby of the station. However, the overall architectural appearance of the station has remained unchanged.

Trains
 Moscow — Kaliningrad
 St.Petersburg — Kaliningrad
 Adler — Kaliningrad
 Chelyabinsk — Kaliningrad (summer)

References

External links

 Train times on Yandex

Railway stations in Kaliningrad Oblast
Buildings and structures in Kaliningrad
Railway stations in Russia opened in 1929
Cultural heritage monuments of regional significance in Kaliningrad Oblast